Sophie Claire Ainsworth (born 22 June 1989) is a British sailor who qualified to compete at the 2016 Summer Olympics being held in Rio de Janeiro, Brazil.

Personal life
Ainsworth was born on 22 June 1989 in Ashford, Kent, England. She studied exercise and sports science at the University of Exeter. Whilst at the university she was sponsored by a local law firm as part of a sports scholarship scheme.

Sailing
She finished tenth at the 2010 European 470 Championships,  alongside fellow University of Exeter alumni Sophie Weguelin. Ainsworth and Weguelin won their first World Cup regatta medal in Miami in 2012, winning the bronze medal as British teammates and training partners Hannah Mills and Saskia Clark won silver. They then won a gold medal at the 2012 European Championship event in Largs, Scotland. The British pair were one of four teams in contention heading into the final race in 2012 and secured the overall title ahead of Solvenian pair Tina Mrak and Teja Cerne despite finishing behind them in the medal race.

In 2013 Ainsworth teamed up with Charlotte Dobson to compete in the 49erFX classification. The 49er is a two-handed skiff-type sailing dinghy with high performance, and the 49erFX is a version designed for a lighter crew (120 kg). It has the same hull, wings, and foils as the 49er but the mast is shorter and the mainsail, jib and gennaker are smaller and lighter. This lowers the centre of gravity and makes the boat easier to sail while improving the overall performance. At the 2014 49er European Championships, held in Helsinki, Finland, the pair managed a sixth place.

The following year, at the 49erFX World Championships, held in San Isidro, Argentina, they finished in fifth place, only four points behind the medal positions.

With these successes behind them, in March 2016 they were selected as part of the Great Britain team for the 2016 Summer Olympics to be held in Rio de Janeiro, Brazil. They are due to compete in the women's 49erFX event, which is making its debut at the Games. They competed in the Princess Sofia Trophy in Palma, Majorca in April 2016, finishing fifth in the opening race before suffering problems with their equipment in race two. They eventually placed sixth overall after taking second place in the final race. Later that month at the 49er European Championships in Barcelona, Spain, Ainsworth and Dobson were joint third after the second day of competition where they finished their three races, first, second and third. A victory in the final medal race meant they eventually finished ninth overall, and seventh among European boats.

References

External links
 
 
 

1989 births
Living people
English female sailors (sport)
Olympic sailors of Great Britain
Sailors at the 2016 Summer Olympics – 49er FX
Alumni of the University of Exeter
People from Ashford, Kent